The Duke Comes Back is a 1937 American drama film directed by Irving Pichel and written by Adele Buffington and Edmond Seward. It is based on the 1933 novel The Duke Comes Back by Lucian Cary. The film stars Allan Lane, Heather Angel, Genevieve Tobin, Johnny Russell, Joseph Crehan and Frederick Burton. The film was released on November 29, 1937, by Republic Pictures.

Plot
Duke Foster dethrones boxing's heavyweight champion, then promptly announces his engagement to Susan Corbin, a high-society girl whose financier father, Arnold Corbin, disapproves of her choice in men. Susan's sensible sister Pauline persuades their father the marriage will be fine and becomes Duke's partner in a publishing business so that he can quit fighting. Four years pass and the Fosters have a son, Jimmy.

Arnold embezzles and loses $200,000 and faces prison. Duke decides to try to raise the money by boxing again. A corrupt promoter, Jim Watson, bets a bundle on Duke's opponent, Bronski, and has Susan and her son taken hostage. Duke is warned to lose the fight, but doesn't believe the threat is true. Al goes to the arena to shoot Duke before he can win the bout and lose Watson's wager, but Al is overpowered, Duke wins and his family is safe.

Cast  
Allan Lane as Duke Foster
Heather Angel as Susan Corbin Foster
Genevieve Tobin as Pauline Corbin
Johnny Russell as Jimmy Foster
Joseph Crehan as Pat Doyle
Frederick Burton as Arnold Corbin
Ben Welden as Barney 
Selmer Jackson as Jim Watson
Clyde Dilson as Parke
George Lynn as Al 
Victor Adams as Nick
Art Lasky as Joe Bronski 
Fred Toones as Snowflake 
Byron Foulger as Peters
George Cooper as Janitor

References

External links
 

1937 films
American drama films
1937 drama films
Republic Pictures films
Films directed by Irving Pichel
American black-and-white films
1930s English-language films
1930s American films